Chris Eaton and Dominic Inglot were the defending champions but decided not to participate.
Alex Kuznetsov and Mischa Zverev defeated Tennys Sandgren and Rhyne Williams 6–4, 6–7(7–4), [10–5] in the final to capture the title.

Seeds

Draw

Draw

References
 Main Draw

Challenger of Dallas - Doubles
2013 Doubles